Martyn William Percy (born 31 July 1962) is a British academic, educator, social scientist and theologian. Ordained as a priest in the Church of England, in 2022 he announced that he was leaving the Church of England, though remains Episcopalian-Anglican. He had been Dean of Christ Church, Oxford, from 2014 to 2022 and principal of Ripon College Cuddesdon, Oxford, from 2004 to 2014.

Percy taught in the Faculty of Theology and Religion, University of Oxford, as well as in Sociology, and was a fellow of the Said Business School at the university. He has also been Professor of Theological Education at King's College London and a professorial research fellow at Heythrop College, University of London. He has also served as a visiting professor of the Institute for the Study of Values at the University of Winchester, a founding fellow of the Center for Theologically Engaged Anthropology at the University of Georgia, and an adjunct professor at Hartford Seminary, Connecticut. He is an emeritus canon of Salisbury Cathedral, having previously served as an honorary canon. He has also been an honorary canon, serving later as canon theologian, at Sheffield Cathedral. In 2018 he became a fellow of King's College London, and a fellow of Harris-Manchester College Oxford.

Percy's theological outlook is rooted in his long-standing commitment to middle-way Anglicanism. His writings fall into three distinct-but-related groups: ecclesiology; contemporary Christianity, religious movements and sociological trends; and anthropological interpretations of denominations and congregations; and spiritual devotional writings. He has also written extensively about theological education, as well as contextual, pastoral and practical theology.

In 2013, The Times Literary Supplement praised Percy for his work towards unity within the Anglican Communion and the Church of England, describing him as displaying a "peaceable, polite and restrained" approach whilst "making peace between competing communities of conviction".

Early life and education
Percy was born on 31 July 1962. He was educated at Merchant Taylors' School, Northwood, the University of Bristol (BA), the University of Durham (Cert. Counselling), King's College London (PhD, 1993) and the University of Sheffield (MEd). After a short career in publishing (1984–1988), he trained for ordination at Cranmer Hall, Durham, from 1988 to 1990.

Ordained ministry
Percy was ordained in the Church of England as a deacon in 1990 and as a priest in 1991. He served as a curate at St Andrew's, Bedford (1990–1994), and was then appointed chaplain and director of studies at Christ's College, Cambridge. In 1997 he was appointed as the founding director of the Lincoln Theological Institute – a research and consultancy body specialising in faith and society (initially based at Sheffield University but now at Manchester University). He left in 2004 to become principal at Cuddesdon.

Cuddesdon
Ripon College Cuddesdon developed significantly from 2004, during Percy's tenure as principal: it incorporated the Oxford Ministry Course (OMC) in 2006, and the West of England Ministerial Training Course (WEMTC) in 2011, making it the largest provider of Anglican ordination training in the UK. The college became internationally more active during Percy's period as principal: it works closely with the Anglican Church in Hong Kong and continues to have links with Anglican colleges in the United States, Canada, South Africa, Australia and New Zealand. During Percy's time at Cuddesdon, the college moved from a distinctively liberal catholic outlook to the broader centre ground of Anglicanism, welcoming ordinands from across the spectrum, thereby reclaiming the "non-party" ethos that Bishop Samuel Wilberforce had founded the college with in 1854.

During Percy's tenure, the multi-award-winning Bishop Edward King Chapel (shortlisted for the Stirling Prize in 2013) and a new education centre (Harriet Monsell House) were built. The college also became the first to incorporate a community of Anglican religious sisters, and to work alongside staff and students offering support in prayer and spirituality, whilst continuing to develop their own ministries of spiritual direction.

Deanery of Christ Church
Percy was the (45th) Dean of Christ Church in Oxford from 2014 to April 2022. He was the first dean to be democratically elected by the governing body, and instituted to the deanery on 4 October 2014. Christ Church is the only academic institution in the world which is also a cathedral – being the seat of the Bishop of Oxford. In common with other cathedral deans, Percy, as Dean of Christ Church, was senior priest of the Diocese of Oxford.  Percy's closing years in office as Dean (roughly from 2018 onwards) were marked by protracted disputes on reformation in the governance of the College.

Settlement 2022
On February 4, 2022 Christ Church agreed to pay Percy a sum in excess of £1 million in compensation and for settlement of the legal fees he had incurred equivalent to ten years’ of salary and benefits. From 2018 Percy had faced over 40 different allegations from members of the Governing Body. All of the charges or allegations Percy had faced had either failed, been dismissed or were successfully defended.  He resigned effective 26 April 2022.

Departure from the Church of England
In May 2022 he announced that he was leaving the Church of England because of his concerns over the management and 'weaponization' of safeguarding, as well as bullying and harassment within the church.

Christ Church disputes

Tribunal and reinstatement (2018–19)
In November 2018, Percy was suspended from office and an independently chaired internal tribunal was established. This followed a formal complaint which had been made against him relating to his attempts to reform and modernise the governance of the college. There were later claims that Percy was the victim of a "bullying campaign" by some members of the college governing body who opposed his reformist agenda. In January 2019, the acting chair of governing body of Christ Church) sent a letter to college alumni saying that Percy's suspension was triggered by a pay dispute, though this was disputed. Supporters of the dean criticised Christ Church's complaints process, as it was claimed no investigation or disciplinary hearing was necessary prior to his suspension from office and putting him on trial. Angela Tilby, a canon emeritus of Christ Church, wrote in the Church Times that Percy faced hostility for desiring to make the institution "more inclusive, more open to the outside world, and, perhaps, more aware of its wealth and vested interests". Paul Bayes (Bishop of Liverpool) and Alan Wilson (Bishop of Buckingham) also conveyed public messages of support.

The statutory tribunal process Percy was subject to was presided over by Sir Andrew Smith, a High Court judge and estimated to have cost the college at least £1.9m. Percy faced 27 charges. On 21 August 2019, the college's governing body confirmed that the tribunal had concluded that all of the charges brought against Percy had been dismissed. The college's legal fees are not known. The governing body declined to engage with the detail of the judgement provided by Smith. During the period of dispute, supporters of Percy raised over £150,000 to help cover the cost of his legal fees, which Christ Church had refused to pay.

Safeguarding claims (2020) 
On 4 March 2020, the college announced that the dean was to be investigated by the Church of England's National Safeguarding Team (NST) over four alleged failures to report safeguarding cases in 2017.  Three further allegations were later added, with a common pattern of the college alerting media and the police in the first instance.

In May 2020, 41 members of Christ Church's governing body published a letter they claimed to have sent to the Charity Commission accusing Percy of "unsound judgment" and of having breached his legal, fiduciary and safeguarding duties since the Smith tribunal. The Charity Commission later confirmed it had never received this letter.

A subsequent investigation by the Church of England’s National Safeguarding Team over the course of six months cleared the dean of any safeguarding wrongdoing and on 8 September Bishop Jonathan Gibbs, the Church of England's lead safeguarding bishop said: "An independent investigation into allegations that the Dean, Martyn Percy, failed to fulfil his safeguarding responsibilities has concluded the Dean acted entirely appropriately in each case. At no point was there any allegation or evidence that the Dean presented a direct risk to any child or vulnerable adult."   Each of the safeguarding complaints were sponsored by Christ Church, yet no individual had ever made any complaint about Percy’s safeguarding practice.

Four weeks after being cleared by the NST on 8 September, (and during Covid-19 restrictions), a female employee of the cathedral alleged Percy had stroked her hair in the cathedral sacristy after a service on 4 October 2020. The woman also reported the matter to Thames Valley Police, the NST and was party to bringing a case under the 2016 Clergy Discipline Measure.  The allegation was dismissed by all these parties. Despite these outcomes, the college once again sought to subject Percy to an internal tribunal at which he would have to bear his own legal costs.

On 17 November 2020, it was announced that Percy had voluntarily withdrawn from his duties as Christ Church dean in response to the allegations and in order to clear his name. He did not resign, but "stepped back from his duties in the College and Cathedral".  One of Britain's most senior Court of Appeal judges, Dame Sarah Asplin, President of Tribunals for the Church of England, ruled on 28 May 2021 that it would be "entirely disproportionate" for the claim to be referred to any clergy disciplinary tribunal.

Regulatory vindication

On May 13 2022 published an article which included extensive reference to his experience with Christ Church citing the deliberate weaponization of safeguarding by elements and individuals within the Church of England as one of his major concerns. On 27 May 2022 some members of the college governing body published a statement responding. 

On November 10, 2022, the Charity Commission, the government regulator, issued an Official Warning to the Governing Body of Christ Church under Section 75 of the 2011 Charities Act for “mismanagement and/or misconduct by the trustees” in their campaign against the Dean, and recorded that £6.6 million had been spent in their actions taken against Percy.  The published Christ Church accounts also recorded an £8 million decline in donations during the four year dispute.

The warning stated that “in the context of a long running dispute with the former Dean, the Commission has determined there has been mismanagement and/or misconduct in the management and administration of the Charity” (para. 9) and “that whatever the cost of taking action against the Dean, the Charity was prepared to take it, which is not consistent with managing the Charity’s resources responsibly” (para. 72). The same paragraph noted that “having read the case files, that the trustees, or a proportion of them, were determined to remove the Dean from the Charity at almost any cost and this is exactly why the Commission has had such concern about the size of the costs incurred in the dispute with him and that this warranted consideration of an Official Warning.”

Other roles
Percy has undertaken a number of roles in public life, specialising in media and consumer affairs. He has served as a director and council member of the Advertising Standards Authority (1999–2006). He was previously an advisor on the "Faith Zone" for the New Millennium Experience Company and the Millennium Dome in London (1999). From 2006 to 2008, he was a member of the Theology and Religious Studies Panel for the HEFCE Research Assessment Exercise. He has served as a member of the Independent Complaints Panel for the Portman Group, the self-regulating body for the alcoholic drinks industry. He has served as commissioner for the Direct Marketing Authority (2008–2014), and currently serves as an advisor to the British Board of Film Classification. He was the elected chair of the Cuddesdon and Denton Parish Council from 2007 to 2014. Percy is also the patron of St Francis' Children's Society (an Adoption and Fostering Agency with a Roman Catholic foundation), and as part of his role as dean was a governor of Christ Church Cathedral School, Westminster School and St Edward's School, Oxford, a trustee of the Grubb Institute, Gladstone's Library (Harwarden) and the Li Tim-Oi Foundation.

Theology

Percy's theology is generally considered to represent the liberal tradition in the Church of England. His viewpoints typically argue for the "middle ground" between evangelical and catholic positions, with appeals to Anglican comprehensiveness, and the tradition of respecting theological differences. Percy's main interlocutors in his writings comprise a trinity of American theologians: Daniel W. Hardy, Urban T. Holmes III, and James F. Hopewell. Percy is a proponent of "generous orthodoxy", and argues for a theological approach that copes with "serious forms of dispute and threat[s] of schism." In 2018, a group of scholars from the fields of sociology, anthropology, musicology, theology and ecclesiology published a book (edited by Ian Markham and Joshua Daniels) on Percy's work to date, based on an earlier symposium engaging with Percy's writings, held at Virginia Theological Seminary (Washington DC) in 2016. The subsequent Reasonable Radical? Reading the Writings of Martyn Percy offers a broad guide to the compass of Percy's work.

Percy has adopted a progressive outlook on a number of social issues, such as LGBTQ rights and the ordination of women. However his writings affirm orthodox Christian positions on the incarnation, atonement, resurrection and ascension; he has consistently defended the historicity of Jesus’ healing and nature miracles. Noted for his work on fundamentalism and revivalism, for which he engages with sociology and anthropology, he was described in the academic journal Theology, by Nigel Rooms, as the British theologian who is the closest to being a "missionary anthropologist".

In 2002, Percy co-founded the Society for the Study of Anglicanism with Tom Hughson, which meets annually at the American Academy of Religion and is now in a full partnership with Virginia Theological Seminary. Percy has served as chair of committee (the oversight body) for Cliff College – a Methodist Bible college in the evangelical-charismatic tradition – and also works with a number of other evangelical groups. He is a vice-president of Modern Church and has been a member of the Faculty of Theology and Religion at the University of Oxford since 2004. From 2014 he has also taught for the Said Business School and for the Department of Sociology at the university.

Percy has been a regular contributor to The Guardian, BBC Radio Four, and the BBC World Service.

Activism and views

Anglican unity
Percy is a social thinker, moralist and commentator, with his activism and writings addressing concerns for social justice and equality. He has spoken and written about the threat of schism in the Anglican Communion, arguing that churches should embrace the diversity of belief that exists, rather than allowing such divisions to result in separation. In anticipation of the October 2003 Anglican Communion Primates' Meeting, which took place in the wake of the ordination of Gene Robinson as Episcopal Bishop of New Hampshire, the communion's first openly gay bishop, he wrote of the need for a "slight loosening of the ties", to avoid a divorce. Illustrating this, he described Anglicanism as an "archipelago – a connection of provincial islands that shares doctrinal, liturgical and cultural aspects", as opposed to being "one vast, catholic continent". He made similar remarks following Jeffrey John's withdrawal as Bishop of Reading, in July 2003, suggesting  debate on gay rights should instead be shifted towards reflecting on the "more central gospel themes".

Church leadership
Percy has been critical of Justin Welby's leadership as Archbishop of Canterbury, in particular his "managerial" style. Percy described Welby's plans to send senior clergy on leadership courses, contained in the 2014 report of the Lord Green Steering Group, as showing a poor judgment of the church's priorities and lacking in theological understanding. He went on to say that Welby's targets for efficiency and growth were not reflective of the Christian mission, given that Jesus "didn't spend a lot of time going on about success."

In August 2016, Percy renewed his criticism of Welby, describing the direction he was leading the Church of England as being "driven by mission-minded middle managers" that alienated congregations and the wider British public. He also raised further concerns about plans to divert funding away from traditional rural parishes and towards evangelical inner-city churches, warning that "it will take more to save the Church of England than a blend of the latest management theory". Percy has also commented on an emerging theological anaemia among bishops in the Church of England, and highlighted the weaknesses and risks this poses for Anglican polity. Percy's 2021 book focuses on the "humble church" and "commends humble leadership", criticizing church leadership.

LGBTQ rights

In an essay published in December 2015, Percy outlined his views on homosexuality, questioning the teaching that it is sinful and unnatural. Regarding the controversy surrounding the issue in the worldwide Anglican Communion, he noted that the church's position has alienated an increasingly progressive country, particularly the younger generation of Christians in Britain; he also called on Justin Welby to formally apologise for the church's role in introducing homophobic teachings to cultures across the British Empire, during the 19th century:

Just days before the commencement of the January 2016 Anglican Communion Primates' Meeting, Percy joined with over 100 other senior Anglicans, including Alan Wilson (Bishop of Buckingham) and David Ison (Dean of St Paul's), in calling on archbishops Welby and Sentamu to acknowledge the failings of the Anglican Communion in its treatment of LGBTQ people. Following the decision of the primates to penalise the US Episcopal Church, for voting to redefine marriage at its 2015 general convention, Percy expressed his disappointment. He went on to say that the meeting's statement regarding this action, "had nothing to say about LGBT Christians, and that's a lost opportunity".

Politics
In the wake of the United Kingdom EU membership referendum in June 2016, Percy has argued that a national "failure of liberal values" was made evident by the result. He has also suggested the need for a more "broad church" approach to British party politics, potentially in the form of a new centre-left party that is "authentically rooted in modern, progressive socialism, and equally true to modern, progressive, democratic liberal values".

Safeguarding
Since 2015, Percy has been actively involved in the campaign to restore the reputation of Bishop George Bell, following the Church of England's decision to compensate a woman who alleged that she had been sexually abused by Bell. He is a member of the George Bell Group and has published a number of key articles questioning the competence of those who have presumed Bell to be a perpetrator of abuse. A subsequent independent report by Lord Carlile of Berriew found that there was no basis in law for presuming that the allegations made against Bell could have been sustained.

In March 2018, Percy called for the church to develop an independent self-regulating authority to handle safeguarding issues, arguing that the churches can only be ultimately trusted as public bodies if they voluntarily relinquish some control over their own policies and practices.

Percy’s work on behalf of victims of sexual abuse in the church has continued alongside IICSA (Independent Inquiry into Child Sexual Abuse) reports focussing on the Church of England. This has included calling for better training and regulation in the churches, and greater fairness, justice and remedy for both the victims of abuse and those who may be falsely accused.

In an article concerning the release by international artists of a music video about victimisation in Church of England safeguarding, Clergy Discipline Measure 2003 abuse complaints as well as the Church's employment of reputation management company, Luther Pendragon, and law firm, Winckworth Sherwood, the Editor of the Church of England Newspaper cited a detailed statement by Percy which he had published on the Surviving Church website:The collusion, coverups, misconduct, incompetence and corruption in safeguarding are well known. The Archbishops do nothing. That is why we must all protest, and invite everybody to show solidarity with the abused, and stand apart from the Church of England until such time as it submits, completely, to public standards of justice and truth…then repents, apologises and starts full and proper redress for its victims. Until then, the Church of England remains unsafe, and is in unsafe hands.

Women bishops
Following the General Synod's narrow rejection of a motion to legalise the ordination of women as bishops in November 2012, Percy wrote in The Daily Telegraph criticising church leaders for failing to create sufficient consensus about the issue. He described the view of opponents to the motion as maintaining a "conceit of modern times" by their fundamentalist rejection of diversity. He also voiced the need for the church to be "transformed by the renewal of our minds" in its approach to the inclusion of women in the Anglican Communion, by moving towards a "new future".

In February 2017, he suggested that Bishop Philip North either decline his nomination as Bishop of Sheffield or renounce the views of The Society, a conservative body which does not recognise or receive the ministry of ordained women, or men ordained by women bishops. North later withdrew his acceptance of the nomination, citing "personal attacks". In a radio discussion of North's decision, Percy refuted the accusation that his position demonstrated a form of "liberal intolerance". He reasoned that resistance to discrimination is not equivalent to intolerance.

Personal life
Percy has the distinction of being the only living theologian mentioned and quoted in Dan Brown's The Da Vinci Code (chapter 55), where Sir Leigh Teabing says, "Everything you need to know about the Bible can be summed up by the great canon doctor Martyn Percy: 'The Bible did not arrive by fax from heaven.'"

Percy is married to Emma Percy, who is chaplain and fellow at Trinity College, Oxford, and together they have two sons. He is a member of the Labour Party, a teetotaler and a lifelong supporter of Everton Football Club. His hobbies include running, playing squash, cinema, and listening to jazz.

In addition to the work edited by Markham and Daniel, Reasonable Radical? Reading the Writings of Martyn Percy (2017), which focuses on Percy's theology, the Northern Irish poet Peter McDonald's Five Psalms for Martyn Percy reworks Psalms 8, 25, 94, 98 and 114 in poetic form to explore aspects of Percy's life using elegy, lament, hope, justice and vindication.

Published works

Key essays in edited books

Other publications
Percy is the founding commissioning senior editor for three current book series with the publisher Routledge. The Explorations in Practical and Pastoral Theology Series (since 2002, with Jeff Astley, Leslie Francis and Nicola Slee – to date, 50 publications); the Contemporary Ecclesiology Series (since 2010 with Bruce Kaye and Tom Hughson SJ – to date, 20 publications); and the Congregational Music Studies Series (since 2016, with Monique Ingalls, Zoe Sherinian and Mark Porter – to date, 10 publications). From 2010-2014, Percy was commissioning series editor with Ian Markham for the Canterbury Press Studies in Anglicanism (comprising 7 edited volumes).

Using three different pseudonyms, Percy has also written other essays, papers, humour, articles, blog contributions and a number of shorter books.

See also
 Oxford Centre for Ecclesiology and Practical Theology

References

External links

Christ Church official website
, hosted by the Oxford Union on 28 April 2016 (in opposition to the motion, This House Believes Religion Remains the Opiate of the Masses)
Patron of Educational Wealth Fund (2018)

1962 births
20th-century English Anglican priests
20th-century Anglican theologians
20th-century British theologians
20th-century Church of England clergy
21st-century English Anglican priests
21st-century Anglican theologians
21st-century British theologians
21st-century Church of England clergy
Alumni of Durham University
Alumni of King's College London
Alumni of the University of Bristol
Anglican socialists
British Christian socialists
British Christian theologians
Christian socialist theologians
Church of England priests
Deans of Christ Church, Oxford
Ecclesiologists
Fellows of King's College London
Hartford Seminary faculty
Labour Party (UK) people
British LGBT rights activists
Living people
People educated at Merchant Taylors' School, Northwood
Practical theologians
Staff of Ripon College Cuddesdon